The Eritrean People's Liberation Front (EPLF), colloquially known as Shabia, was an armed Marxist–Leninist organization that fought for the independence of Eritrea from Ethiopia. It emerged in 1970 as a far-left to left-wing nationalist group that split from the Eritrean Liberation Front (ELF). After achieving Eritrean independence in 1991, it transformed into the People's Front for Democracy and Justice (PFDJ), which serves as Eritrea's sole legal political party.

Background
EPLF and Eritrean Liberation Front first fought during the Eritrean Civil War. In the early 1980s, new armed conflicts between the rival Eritrean Liberation Front led to the front being marginalized and pushed into neighboring Sudan. The EPLF remained the only relevant opposition to Ethiopian occupation in Eritrea.

The EPLF captured many Ethiopian soldiers during the war and kept them in numerous prisoner of war camps, although captured soldiers of the EPLF (of their own) were not afforded the same treatment. These prisoners were not harmed by their captors, but instead were indoctrinated about the principles of the EPLF, as well as global politics. Some segments of the EPLF went as far as teaching prisoners of war some trades and skills.

During its protracted struggle the EPLF constructed an underground hospital. In these hospitals surgeries were conducted as well as the production of various pharmaceuticals (the first of its kind made by Eritreans). The front also constructed schools in the rebel areas, as well as underground and partially outdoor schools for the children of the EPLF (i.e. Winna). 
In 1988, the EPLF started an attack from the northern province of Sahel towards the south. The EPLF emerged as the dominant rebel force as early as 1977 and continued the struggle of the Eritrean War of Independence. In 1991, the EPLF succeeded in the conflict on May 24, 1991.

Notable Battles
 Adi Yakob – Embaderho front (Northern front) 
 Adi Hawsha – Sela'e Da'ero front (Southern front)
 Military Retreat (1977, Soviet intervention; overthrow of Ethiopian Empire by Derg)
 Ela Beri'ed
 Massawa I (1977, Salina salt fields)
 Siege of Barentu
 Nakfa I and II (II against Nadew Command)
 Afabet (against Nadew Command)
 Massawa II (1990, dubbed "Operation Fenkil")
 Ghinda
 Dekemhare
 Assab (after Eritrean independence)

Administration

The First Congress of the EPLF occurred in January 1977 and formally set out the policies of this new organization. At this first meeting a Secretary-General and Assistant Secretary-General were elected and a program adopted. This program specifically targeted a liberalization of women's rights as well as a broad educational policy for maintaining every language and improving literacy. It was also set out that the boundaries of an Eritrean state would be based on the colonial treaties of Italy.

The Second Congress in 1987, brought together the EPLF and the Eritrean Liberation Front/Central Leadership (also sometimes referred to as Central Command, CC) in what was called the Unity Congress. This was the culmination of negotiations over three years which had brought together the two fighting forces in October 1986, under a unified command. On this congress, Isaias Afewerki replaced secretary-general Ramadan Nur. Subsequently, the movement abandoned most of its formerly Marxist–Leninist ideology, in favour of an own revolutionary left-wing concept and a more comprehensive and pragmatic approach to unite all Eritrean nationalists.

The Third and last Congress of the EPLF was held in 1994 in Asmara. It was important as it converted the Front from a military organization to a purely political movement. At the time, the organization had 95,000 members. At this Congress, the name of the organization was changed to the People's Front for Democracy and Justice (PFDJ).

References

External links
Official Website
List of incidents attributed to the Eritrean Peoples Liberation Front on the START database

African socialist political parties
Communism in Eritrea
Defunct communist militant groups
Eritrean nationalism
Eritrean War of Independence
Factions of the Ethiopian Civil War
History of Eritrea
National liberation movements in Africa
Parties of one-party systems
Political parties disestablished in 1994
Political parties established in 1970
Rebel groups in Eritrea
Rebel groups in Ethiopia